"I'll Meet You Halfway" is a song written by Wes Farrell and Gerry Goffin and recorded by The Partridge Family for their 1971 album, Up to Date. It went to No.4 on the Adult Contemporary chart and reached No.9 on The Billboard Hot 100 in 1971.

Background
Cash Box considered the song to be the Partridge Family's "strongest to date.
The strings and horns on the song were arranged by Mike Melvoin.

Cover versions
David Cassidy on 2002 album, Then and Now
Roger Williams on his 1971 album, Summer of '42

References

1971 singles
Songs written by Wes Farrell
The Partridge Family songs
1971 songs
Songs with lyrics by Gerry Goffin
Bell Records singles
Song recordings produced by Wes Farrell